Travis Nelson is an American politician and nurse serving as a member of the Oregon House of Representatives from the 44th district. He assumed office on February 1, 2022. He is the first openly LGBTQ+ man of color and the first openly LGBTQ+ African American to ever serve in the Oregon Legislature.

Early life and education 
Nelson was born in poverty to teenage parents in Louisiana and moved to Kennewick, Washington as a child. He earned an Associate of Science in Nursing from Columbia Basin Community College and a Bachelor of Science in Nursing from Washington State University.

Career 
Travis Nelson started his career as a nurse for PeaceHealth in the Portland, Oregon area, specializing in medical, surgical, cardiac, rehabilitation and emergency nursing. Nelson is currently a union representative and the vice president of the Oregon Nurses Association. Nelson was appointed to the Oregon House of Representatives in February 2022 by members of the Multnomah County Commission, succeeding Tina Kotek.

In his first legislative session, he secured $15 million for a new aquatic complex in North Portland. in 2022, he was appointed to serve on the state Reproductive Health and Access to Care Work Group in anticipation of the overturning of Roe Vs. Wade. This workgroup was charged with ensuring that Oregon closed gaps in reproductive health rights.

Electoral history

2022

References 

Living people
African-American state legislators in Oregon
American nurses
Democratic Party members of the Oregon House of Representatives
Politicians from Portland, Oregon
Washington State University alumni
People from Multnomah County, Oregon
African-American nurses
Year of birth missing (living people)
LGBT state legislators in Oregon